is a Japanese footballer currently playing as a defender for Omiya Ardija.

Career statistics

Club
.

Notes

References

External links

1998 births
Living people
Japanese footballers
Association football defenders
Senshu University alumni
J2 League players
Omiya Ardija players